Wrestle Talk TV is a weekly (originally fortnightly) talk show about professional wrestling. It was presented by Francesca Wood and Adam Brown (who replaced Marty Scurll). It was first hosted by Joel Ross, and then by various guest hosts for a period in 2014. The show was released monthly on YouTube from September 2011 to March 2012, before it moved to the television channel Challenge in the United Kingdom, in August 2012. Wrestle Talk TV is now an official daily wrestling YouTube show hosted by Oli Davis,  Luke Owen D.A.D., Brian "Tempest" Joyce, 'El Fakidor' Laurie Blake, 'Chopper' Pete Quinnell, Adam Blampied, Denise Salcedo, SP3, Sat E. Niangi, Andy Datson, Sullivan Beau Brown, and Dan J. Layton They also have a podcast called the "WrestleTalk Podcast", formerly known as "WrestleRamble". In 2020, WrestleTalk would return briefly to television on Fight Network on Mondays.

WrestleTalk.com also provides news update, features on wrestlers. The website team consists of Editor-in-Chief Andy Datson, Liam Winnard,  Brian "Tempest" Joyce and Nate Craver.

There are also two spinoff channels that fall under the WrestleTalk umbrella. Parts Funknown which hosts wrestling lists and fantasy booking as well as Quizzlemania. No Rolls Barred is the other spinoff channel that focuses on board and tabletop gaming.

WrestleRamble

Wrestle Talk's YouTube channel started the WrestleRamble, known then as ThatWrestleTalkShow, in April 2017. It is hosted by Oli Davis, Luke Owen and occasionally Laurie Blake, Pete Quinnell or Andy Datson and in 2020, former WhatCulture personality Adam Blampied joined the channel. On the podcast, they review WWE Raw, SmackDown, NXT, AEW Dynamite and PPV. Occasionally they review NJPW shows. They have also reviewed All In.

Episodes

Series overview

YouTube series 
Aired from 26 September 2011 to 27 March 2012

Season 1 
Aired from 26 August 2012 to 24 February 2013

Season 2 
Aired from 3 March 2013 to 1 September 2013

Season 3 
Aired from 8 September 2013 to 29 December 2013

Season 4 
Aired from 9 February 2014 to 21 September 2014

Season 5 
Aired from 5 October 2014 to 28 December 2014

Season 6 
Aired from 4 January 2015 to 12 July 2015

Season 7 
Aired from 19 July 2015 to 27 December 2015

See also

TNA British Boot Camp
List of professional wrestling television series

References

External links
 https://youtube.com/user/WrestletalkTV

Professional wrestling television series
YouTube original programming
2011 British television series debuts
2015 British television series endings
English-language television shows
Professional wrestling in the United Kingdom